Sri Lanka competed in the 2010 Commonwealth Games held in Delhi, India, from 3 to 14 October 2010. Sri Lanka was represented by 94 athletes (73 male, 21 female) in 14 sports, with Diving, Lawn Bowls, Field Hockey, Rhythmic gymnastics and Netball not being represented. The 94 athletes represented an increase of 28 from Melbourne in 2006. Also the contingent consisted of 45 officials.
Chinthana Vidanage was the flag bearer.

Medals

Medalists

| align="left" valign="top"|

Archery

Sri Lanka will send 4 archers to the 2010 commonwealth games.

Men

Women

Athletics

Sri Lanka sent a team of 15 athletes to the 2010 Commonwealth games.

Men

Women

Badminton
Sri Lanka will send 6 shuttlers. The mixed doubles and women's doubles teams are currently unannounced.

Men

Women

Mixed Team

Sri Lanka was ranked 12th in the draw and drew #3 Singapore, #5 New Zealand, #13 Jamaica and tied for #20 (last place) Northern Ireland.

Group B

Boxing
Sri Lanka will send 7 boxers.

Men

Cycling

Sri Lanka will send 5 cyclists.

Men

Road
Men

Women

Gymnastics

Sri Lanka will send a gymnastics team of 5 for the 2010 Commonwealth games.

Artistic

Men
 Tharindu Paththapperuma
 Prasad Sameera Ekanayake
Women
 Ganesha Abeysundara
 Amindha Rathnayake

Rugby sevens
Sri Lanka has qualified a rugby sevens team for the 2010 Commonwealth games. The team will consist of 12 athletes.

 Mahesh Liyanage
 Gayan Weerarathne
 Saliya Kumara
 Kuruppu Saranga
 Harsha Weerarathna
 Radhika Hettiarachchi

 Darshana Ethipola
 Mithra Jayasinghe
 Danuska Hadapangodage
 Chanaka Chandimal
 Charitha Senevirathna
 Dilan Soysa

Squash

Sri Lanka competed in squash at the 2010 Commonwealth games.

Men

Women

Mixed

Pool 6

Shooting

Sri Lanka will send 3 shooters to the 2010 Commonwealth Games.

Men
 Edirisinghe Senanayake
 Sarath Chandrasiri
 Mangala Samarakoon

Swimming
Men

Women

Synchronized swimming

Sri Lanka competed in synchronized swimming for the first time at the Commonwealth games.

Table tennis
Sri Lanka will send 6 paddlers.

Men
 Rohan Sirisena
 Dinesh Deshappriya
 Nirmala Bandara Jayasinghe
Women
 Nuwani Nawodya
 Ishara Mudurangi
 Kavindi Rukmali Sahabandu

Tennis

Men

Women

Mixed

Weightlifting

Sri Lanka sent a team of 10 weightlifters.

Men

Men – EAD (Powerlifting)

Wrestling

Sri Lanka will send 3 wrestlers to New Delhi

Men's Freestyle

See also
 2010 Commonwealth Games

References 

Nations at the 2010 Commonwealth Games
2010
2010 in Sri Lankan sport